Club de Fútbol Correcaminos de la Universidad Autónoma de Tamaulipas, simply known as Correcaminos UAT, is a Mexican professional football club based in Ciudad Victoria, Tamaulipas.

It currently plays in the Liga de Expansión MX. The team was founded in 1980, Correcaminos played in the Primera Division De Mexico from the 1987–88 season to the 1994–95 season. They play in the Estadio Marte R. Gómez, which has a capacity of 10,520.

History
The club was founded in 1980 and represents the UAT as well as the city of Ciudad Victoria. It replaced the city's former team, Los Cuerudos, following the team's folding in 1978. The club joined the Segunda División de México in 1982 and played in the 1982–83 tournament. In the 1986–87 tournament the club reached the championship final against the Universidad Autónoma de Querétaro having to play a decisive third game in the Estadio Azteca where the club finally managed to beat Querétaro in a penalty shootout and earning their first Promotion. The club did not fare so well in their first year in the Mexican Primera División finishing tied dead last with Atletico Potosino and only avoided being relegated by a goal difference. Before the 1988–89 tournament the club managed to keep its category after buying the Deportivo Neza Franchisee and taking over their vacant spot. The club would go on to play 7 years in the first division before been relegated in 1995, this time they did not buy any franchise to save their status and instead accepted their fate of playing in the newly created Liga de Ascenso. In the summer 1997 the club reached its first final since joining the league only to lose it to Tigres UANL who would go on to be promoted to the first division having won the previous tournament as well. In the Apertura 2005 and Clausura 2006 the club had one of the strongest teams in the league finishing first in both tournament but losing in the round robin first to León and then to Indios de Ciudad Juárez in semi-finals.

Apertura 2011 Title
In the Apertura 2011 the club finished second in the league with 27 points, 7 wins, 6 draws, 2 defeats, scoring the most goals in the league with 33 and allowing 21 earning a round robin spot. In the Quarter-finals the club faced cross town rival Estudiantes de Altamira who they tied 2–2 after 2 games advancing for having finished with more points. In Semi-finals the club would once again tie 3–3 this time against Toros Neza advancing once again because of their league position. In the final the club would go on to face the league points leader La Piedad who was picked favorite by many to take the Apertura title home that year. The first match was played in the Estadio Marte R. Gómez where Correcaminos managed to take a 3–1 advantage. The second match was played in the Estadio Juan N. López where after 90 minutes the club had managed to beat La Piedad after almost 15 years with a score of 1–0 and claiming that tournaments title.

Club honors
Liga de Ascenso: (1) Apertura 2011
Runner-up: (1) Verano 1997

Segunda División: (1) 1986–87
Copa MX
Runner-up: (1) Apertura 2012

Season to season

 Has Played 5 2nd Division Tournaments last in 1987.
 Has Played 32 Primera A Tournaments last in 2011.
 Has Played 8 Mexican Primera División Tournaments last in 1995.
 After the 1987–88 tournament the club avoided relegation after buying the Deportivo Neza franchise.
On 26 September 2012 the club advanced to the semi-finals winning the game versus Tijuana with a remarkable score of 5–5 changing and advantage of losing 4–1. The game was defined in penalty kicks, having a glorious and historical victory winning the Correcaminos 7–6 in penalties.

Personnel

Management

Coaching staff

Players

First-team squad

Out on loan

Reserve teams
Correcaminos UAT Premier
Reserve team that plays in the Liga Premier in the third level of the Mexican league system.

Correcaminos UAT (Liga TDP)
Reserve team that plays in the Liga TDP, the fourth level of the Mexican league system.

Notable players
This list of former players includes those who received international caps while playing for the team, made significant contributions to the team in terms of appearances or goals while playing for the team, or who made significant contributions to the sport either before they played for the team, or after they left. It is clearly not yet complete and all inclusive, and additions and refinements will continue to be made over time.

 Claudio Borghi
 Marcelo Espina
 Norberto Orrego
 Joaquin Botero
 Lucas Silva
 Eliseo "Cheyo" Quitanilla
 Raúl Martínez Sambulá
 Carlos Pavón
 Rodolfo Richardson Smith
 Marco Antonio Ferreira
 Humberto Filizola
 Rubén González
 Víctor René Mendieta
 Jorge Daniel Cabrera
 Kalusha Bwalya

Managers

 Héctor Hugo Eugui (1987)
 Héctor Pulido (1988–89)
 Ignacio Jáuregui (1989–91)
 Héctor Hugo Eugui (1991–93)
 Rubén "Ratón" Ayala (1992–94)
 Aníbal Ruiz (1998–00)
 José Luis Saldívar (2005)
 Sergio Orduña (2006–07)
 Raúl Gutiérrez (2007–09)
 Raúl Martínez Sambulá (2009)
 Joaquín del Olmo (2009)
 Jorge Almirón (2010–11)
 Ignacio Rodríguez (2011–12)
 José Luis Sánchez (2012)
 Joaquín del Olmo (2013)
 Omar Arellano Nuño (2014)
 José Treviño (2015–16)
 Jorge Alberto Urbina (Interim) (2016)
 Jaime Ordiales (2017)
 Ricardo Rayas (2017–18)
 Juan Carlos Chávez (2018–19)
 Carlos Reinoso (2019)
 Roberto Hernández (2020–2021)
 Hibert Ruíz (2021)
 Daniel Alcántar (2021)
 Francisco Rotllán (2021)
 Jorge Urbina (2022)
 Héctor Altamirano (2022)

References

External links
Official site

 
Football clubs in Tamaulipas
Ascenso MX teams
1982 establishments in Mexico